Davor Pejčinović (born 28 March 1971) is a retired Croatian basketball player. A 2.11 m center, he participated in the 2000-01 Euroleague with KK Zadar.

Pejčinović was a member of the Croatian national team that won the bronze medal in the 1995 Eurobasket.

References

External links 
Adriatic League Profile
TBLStat.net Profile

1971 births
Living people
ABA League players
BC Kyiv players
Centers (basketball)
Croatian men's basketball players
Keravnos B.C. players
KK Budućnost players
Élan Béarnais players
KK Cibona players
KK Zadar players
Pallacanestro Varese players
Olympia Larissa B.C. players
Shanghai Sharks players
HKK Široki players
Bashkimi Prizren players
KK Zrinjevac players
KK Dubrava players
1994 FIBA World Championship players
Helios Suns players